Lound Lakes is a  nature reserve and series of reservoirs on the border between the English counties of Norfolk and Suffolk. It is owned by Essex and Suffolk Water and managed by the Suffolk Wildlife Trust.

The lakes were originally created as a result of peat digging in the medieval period. They consist of a number of reservoirs and feed into Fritton Decoy and then to the River Waveney to the west. The catchment is primarily arable land and this leads to nitrate runoff into the lakes, creating issues for water supply and habitat management.

Habitats in this site include open water, woodland, grassland, rush pasture and fen meadow. Over 140 bird species have been recorded there, including hobbies, geese, ducks, reed warblers, gadwalls and oystercatchers. Brown long-eared and noctule bats are also present.

There is access from various points including Hall Road and Hobland Road.

References

External links

Suffolk Wildlife Trust